Blue Matter may refer to:

 Blue Matter (John Scofield album), 1986
 Blue Matter (Savoy Brown album), 1969